Everybody's Business is a 1919 American silent drama film directed by J. Searle Dawley and starring Charles Richman and Alice Calhoun. It is now considered a lost film and the full cast is unknown. It marked the screen debut of Calhoun.

Partial cast
 Charles Richman as Tom Oakes
 Alice Calhoun as Mildred Arden

References

Bibliography
 Connelly, Robert B. The Silents: Silent Feature Films, 1910-36, Volume 40, Issue 2. December Press, 1998.
 Munden, Kenneth White. The American Film Institute Catalog of Motion Pictures Produced in the United States, Part 1. University of California Press, 1997.

External links
 

1919 films
1919 drama films
1910s English-language films
American silent feature films
Silent American drama films
American black-and-white films
Films directed by J. Searle Dawley
1910s American films